Ranu Kumbolo is a mountainous lake located in Bromo Tengger Semeru National Park, East Java, Indonesia. The lake is part of easiest route from Ranu Pani to Mount Semeru peak.

Hiking 
There are hiking camp area around the lake. Ranu Kumbolo is part of easiest route from Ranu Pani to Mahameru peak.

Gallery

References

Lakes of East Java